Elections to Sheffield City Council were held on 8 May 1986. One third of the council was up for election. Since the 1984 election, the Conservatives had successfully defended two seats in Broomhill and Labour had held one of their Park seats in by-elections the following year.

Election result

|- style="background-color:#F9F9F9"
! style="background-color: " |
| Christian Ecology
| align="right" | 0
| align="right" | 0
| align="right" | 0
| align="right" | 0
| align="right" | 0.0
| align="right" | 0.0
| align="right" | 84
| align="right" | New
|-

This result had the following consequences for the total number of seats on the Council after the elections:

Ward results

George Munn was a sitting councillor for Darnall ward

|- style="background-color:#F9F9F9"
! style="background-color: " |
| Christian Ecology
| Roger Dunn
| align="right" | 84
| align="right" | 1.6
| align="right" | +1.6
|-

References

1986 English local elections
1986
1980s in Sheffield